William Erwin Mayer (September 24, 1923 – February 10, 2010) was an American government official who served as the Alcohol, Drug Use and Mental Health Administrator from 1981 to 1983 and then Assistant Secretary of Defense for Health Affairs from 1983 to 1989.

Career 
Mayer was born in 1923 and his parents where dentists. He went to school at University of Washington, Northwestern University Medical School, and the University of California Medical Center in San Francisco. While still in medical school, he joined the United States Navy in 1946. Mayer served in the Navy Medical Corps and was assigned to the 1st Marine Division as a medical officer during the Korean War, receiving a bronze star with valor. He transferred to the U.S. Army Medical Corps in 1952. Mayer was then assigned as a psychiatrist to work with Korea prisoners of war and received a second bronze star. After the war, he became a leading expert on communist brainwashing techniques. Mayer retired from military service in 1958.

Mayer also was Director of Health, Director of the International Forum on AIDS Research at the National Academy of Sciences and was the US Assistant surgeon general of the United States.

Before he was administrator for Alcohol, Drug use and Substance Abuse, he was the chief medical officer at the San Diego health department. Prior to that, he served as the Director of the California Department of Health from 1973 to 1975 as well as the Director of the California Department of Mental Health from 1971 to 1973. Mayer also administered public health to those in Humboldt, Contra Costa and the Del Norte counties in California.

References 

1923 births
2010 deaths
University of Washington alumni
Military personnel from Illinois
Feinberg School of Medicine alumni
Physicians from Illinois
United States Army Medical Corps officers
United States Navy Medical Corps officers
United States Navy personnel of the Korean War
Politicians from Chicago
Illinois Republicans
Reagan administration personnel
United States Assistant Secretaries of Defense